Mohamed Moustaoui (born 2 April 1985, in Khouribga) is a Moroccan middle distance runner who specializes in the 1500 metres. He was born in Khouribga.

Competition record

Personal bests
Outdoors
800 metres - 1:45.44 (2009)
1500 metres - 3:31.84 (2011)
One mile - 3:50.08 (2008)
3000 metres - 7:43.99 (2011)
5000 metres - 13:22.61 (2005)
Indoors
1000 metres - 2:20.00 (2008)
1500 metres - 3:35.0 (2014)
2000 metres - 5:00.98 (2007)
3000 metres - 7:40.00 (2014)
Two miles - 8:26.49 (2005)

External links
 

1985 births
Living people
Moroccan male middle-distance runners
Olympic athletes of Morocco
Athletes (track and field) at the 2008 Summer Olympics
Athletes (track and field) at the 2012 Summer Olympics
People from Khouribga
Mediterranean Games silver medalists for Morocco
Mediterranean Games medalists in athletics
Athletes (track and field) at the 2009 Mediterranean Games
Islamic Solidarity Games competitors for Morocco